In 1988, the Professional Soil Classifiers Association of Mississippi selected Natchez silt loam soil to represent the soil resources of the State. These soils exist on 171,559 acres (0.56% of state) of landscape in Mississippi.

Mississippi state soil
The Natchez Silt Loam as the official state soil, designated by the Mississippi Legislature in 2003.

Description
The Natchez soils formed in very deep loess material under a woodland environment and a climate that was warm and humid. These soils have natural fertility and desirable tilth but usually occur on slopes that limit their use to trees. In areas where slopes are less, pasture and row crops are grown and the soil is very productive when good management is applied.

A typical Natchez soil profile consists of a 3 inch top soil of dark grayish brown silt loam and to 8 inches, a subsurface of brown silt loam, a yellowish brown and dark yellowish brown silt loam subsoil to 36 inches and a substratum that is yellowish brown, and dark yellowish brown silt loam down to 80 inches.

Soil family classification

Classified as coarse-silty, mixed, superactive, thermic typic eutrudepts:

Natchez soils are in the Inceptisols soil order. Inceptisols soils have developed in relatively young material that have an Ochric epipedon is rich in weatherable minerals. The term coarse-silty indicates that the subsoil has less than 18 percent clay with less than 15 percent sand coarser than very fine. The term mixed suggests that no one mineral is over 60 percent. Thermic refers to an average annual soil temperature between 15 and 22 degrees Celsius (59 to 72 degrees Fahrenheit) and differs more than 5 degrees Celsius (9 °F) between winter and summer at 50 cm (20 inches) below the surface.

Natchez soils are on strongly sloping to very steep hillsides in the highly dissected parts of the bluff hills that border the Mississippi Delta floodplains. They formed in silty loess material that ranges from strongly acid to neutral in the upper part and neutral to slightly alkaline in lower parts. Average annual precipitation is 52 inches. Average annual air temperature is 63 °F (17 °C). The soil has developed in the upper Pleistocene age material.

See also
List of U.S. state soils
Soil type

Sources
This article utilizes text taken verbatim from Natchez Silt Loam- Mississippi State Soil, a public domain publication of the United States Department of Agriculture.

Pedology
Soil in the United States
Geology of Mississippi
Symbols of Mississippi
Types of soil